Katlakalns is a neighbourhood of Riga, the capital of Latvia. It is linked to Ķengarags and Maskavas forštate by the Southern Bridge erected in 2004-2008 and opened on November 17, 2008.

Katlakalns village of Ķekava parish also belongs to this neighborhood.

References

Sources 

Neighbourhoods in Riga